Mukhin (from муха meaning fly) is a Russian masculine surname, its feminine counterpart is Mukhina. It may refer to:

 Andrey Mukhin (born 1971), Ukrainian luger
 Elena Mukhina (1960–2006), Russian gymnast
 Jelena Muhhina (born 1988), Estonian figure skater
 Lena Mukhina (1924–1991), Russian writer 
 Lev Mukhin (1936–1977), Soviet boxer
 Nikolay Aleksandrovich Mukhin (born 1955), Russian iconographer and sculptor
 Rinat Mukhin (born 1994), Kazakhstani cross-country skier
 Vera Mukhina (1889–1953), Soviet sculptor
 Yury Mukhin (conspiracy theorist) (born 1949), Russian conspiracy theorist
 Yury Mukhin (swimmer) (born 1971), Russian swimmer

See also
Muhhin
Muhin, a Bangladeshi singer

Russian-language surnames